Georges Alphonse Bertier (1877–1962) was a French educator, Director of the , and co-founder of secular Scouting in France. Co-founder of Eclaireurs de France, he founded one of the first recorded Boy Scout troops in 1910 at École des Roches (pioneer of Active learning).

He served as  President of Eclaireurs de France between 1920 and 1936, and later as President of Eclaireurs Neutres de France from 1952 to his death.

References

French educational theorists
1877 births
1962 deaths
People from Nancy, France
Scouting and Guiding in France
20th-century French educators